Palghar Assembly constituency is one of the 288 Vidhan Sabha (legislative assembly) constituencies of Maharashtra state, western India. This constituency is located in Palghar district.

Geographical scope
The constituency comprises parts of Dahanu Taluka viz. revenue circles Kasa and Chinchani, parts of Palghar Taluka viz. revenue circles Tarapur, Palghar and
Palghar Municipal Council.

Members of Legislative Assembly

Election results

2019 results

2016 by-election

2014 results

2009 results

References

Assembly constituencies of Palghar district
Palghar
Assembly constituencies of Maharashtra